Shahrokh Bayani (31 December 1960) is an Iranian former football midfielder who played for Iran in the 1984 Asian Cup. He also played for Esteghlal, Al-Shamal and Zob Ahan and Iran national football team .

International records

Honours

Country
AFC Asian Cup
Fourth Place (1): 1984

References

External links
Team Melli Stats

1960 births
Living people
Iranian footballers
Iran international footballers
Esteghlal F.C. players
Persepolis F.C. players
Al-Shamal SC players
Zob Ahan Esfahan F.C. players
Iranian expatriate footballers
1984 AFC Asian Cup players
1992 AFC Asian Cup players
Asian Games gold medalists for Iran
Footballers at the 1986 Asian Games
Sportspeople from Tehran
Asian Games medalists in football
Footballers at the 1990 Asian Games
Association football midfielders
Medalists at the 1990 Asian Games
20th-century Iranian people